Patrick Joseph Curran, known as Pat Curran or sometimes Joe Curran (13 November 1917 – December 2003) was an English professional footballer who played as an inside forward.

Career
Born in Sunderland, Curran played for St Joseph's Boys, Sunderland St Patrick, Sunderland, Ipswich Town, Watford and Bradford City.

For Sunderland, he made 1 appearance in the Football League.

For Ipswich, he made 7 appearances in the Football League, scoring 1 goal; he also made 2 other first-team appearances.

He played for Bradford City between June 1947 and 1948. He made 5 appearances in the Football League for them, scoring 1 goal.

Sources

References

1917 births
2003 deaths
English footballers
Sunderland A.F.C. players
Ipswich Town F.C. players
Watford F.C. players
Bradford City A.F.C. players
English Football League players
Association football inside forwards